2MASS J11193254–1137466 AB (often shortened to 2MASS J1119–1137 AB) is a planetary mass binary located  light-years from the Earth in the constellation Crater. The components of 2MASS J1119–1137 are each roughly four Jupiter masses. The planetary-mass objects are probably a part of the TW Hydrae association which has an age of approximately 10 million years. The planetary-mass objects are candidate rogue planets.

Overview
The object was found by a team of scientists from Canada, the United States and Chile during a search for unusually red brown dwarfs (such color indicates some notable properties of their atmospheres, e.g. dustiness). The search used data of 3 surveys: SDSS (visible light data), 2MASS (near-infrared) and WISE (mid-wave infrared).  was one of the reddest and, according to the authors, the most interesting object found. Results of the work were published in December 2015.

In April 2016, the first detailed study of the object was published. The investigators conducted its infrared spectroscopy on the telescope Gemini South. Radial velocity and proper motion were also calculated.

In November 2016 and March 2017,  was imaged by the telescope Keck II with adaptive optics technique, which revealed its binarity. The angular separation of components is  arcseconds (which corresponds to linear projected separation ). Their stellar magnitudes are roughly equal. Total mass of the system is estimated as 7.4 Jupiter masses. Their total bolometric luminosity is approximately 0.00004 solar units. The estimated orbital period is 90 years.

One of the components of binary is rotating rapidly, having a period 3.02 hours while the typical rotation period for young brown dwarfs is 10 hours.

Candidate exomoon 
A possible single transit of the moon candidate was detected in archival Spitzer Space Telescope data. The study determined that the detected event might have been caused by variability (clouds/weather) in the host planet's atmosphere, but that an exomoon was a better fit to the observed data suggesting that the detection was most likely caused by an exomoon transit.

See also
 PSO J318.5-22
 Kepler-1625b I
 Kepler-1708b

References

External links 

 2MASS J1119–1137 

J11193254-1137466
Exoplanets detected by direct imaging
Giant planets
Exoplanets discovered in 2015
Rogue planets
Binary systems
Crater (constellation)
TW Hydrae association